Big Dreamers is a 55-minute documentary film showcasing the Big Things of Australia. Directed by Camille Hardman, and produced by Camille Hardman and John Fink, Big Dreamers features the construction of The Biggest Gumboot in the world in Tully, in far North Queensland.

Plot 
Tully was a prosperous town in tropical north Queensland, until Brazil dumped its sugar surplus on the global market. The locals call a meeting to save the town from financial disaster. Ron Hunt stands up and proposes to build The World's Biggest Gumboot in honour of Tully's rainfall record of 7.98 metres in 1950.

Ron declares the Big Golden Gumboot will put Tully on the map, so he and the local Rotary Club hire out-of-towner Bryan Newell to build the edifice. Tully's local artist and fellow Rotarian. Roger Chandler is not pleased. The cost of the boot blows out to $90,000, and the construction is endlessly delayed by rain.

Personalities clash, and Ron wonders whether he has made the right decision.

Dispersed throughout the main narrative are small vignettes highlighting other Big Things around Australia.

Cast 
Ron Hunt – Rotarian
Bryan Newell – Boot builder
Roger Chandler – Local Artist
Tip Byrne – Mayor of Tully
Sera & Cerrino Qualiata – Cane Farmers
Rotary Club of Tully
Townsfolk of Tully
Kevin Rubie – The Big Banana, Coffs Harbour, New South Wales
Eric Peltz – The Big Lobster, Kingston SE, South Australia
Fred Glasbrenner – The Big Abalone, Laverton North, Victoria
Dianne & Roger Venning – The Big Galah, Kimba, South Australia
Joyce Peterson – The Big Orange, Gayndah, Queensland
Fran Myors – The Big Koala, Phillip Island, Victoria
Jim Mauger – The Big Potato, Robertson, New South Wales

Awards 
Winner, 2007 Award of Excellence – Videography

Film festivals 
Big Dreamers featured in a number of Film Festivals worldwide Including:

2007 SILVERDOCS: AFI/Discovery Channel Documentary Festival, Washington, USA
2007 Hot Springs Documentary Film Festival, Arkansas, USA
2007 Melbourne International Film Festival, Victoria, Australia
2007 Revelation Perth International Film Festival, Perth, Australia
2007 Kansas International Film Festival, Kansas City, USA
2007 Palm Beach International Film Festival, Florida, USA
2007 deadCENTER Film Festival, Oklahoma, USA
2007 Byron Bay International Film Festival, NSW, Australia
2007 Big Sky Documentary Film Festival, Montana, USA
2007 Dungog Film Festival, Dungog, Australia
2008 Wisconsin Film Festival, Madison, USA
2008 Cork International Film Festival, Cork, Ireland

References

External links 
 
 Allmovie - Mark Deming, The New York Times, USA
 NewWest’s top picks for the 2007 Big Sky Documentary Film Festival - Andy Smetanka, Montana, USA
 Sydney Morning Herald - Tim Elliott
 Media Search - Matthew Pejkovic
 Urban Cinefile - Andrew L Urban
  Filmink Magazine - Jim Mitchell
 Lost at E Minor - Xavier Toby
 Screen Hub - Alex Prior
 Wentworth Courier - Drew Sheldrick, Australia
 
 If Magazine

2007 films
Australian documentary films
2007 documentary films